Bilasipara West Assembly constituency is one of the 126 constituencies of the Assam Legislative Assembly in India. Bilasipara West forms a part of the Dhubri Lok Sabha constituency.

Members of Legislative Assembly

Bilasipara constituency
 1951: Md.Umaruddin, Independent.
 1957: Ahmed Jahanuddin, PSP.
 1962: Derajuddin Sarkar, Indian National Congress.
 1967: Giasuddin Ahmed, Independent.
 1972: Giasuddin Ahmed, Independent.

Bilasipara West constituency
Following is the list of past members representing Bilasipara West constituency Assembly constituency in Assam Legislature.

 1978: Giasuddin Ahmed, Independent.
 1983: Sirajuddin, Indian National Congress.
 1985: Yusuf Ali Ahmed, Independent.
 1991: Giasuddin Ahmed, Communist Party of India.
 1996: Ali Akbar Miah, All India Indira Congress (Tiwari).
 2001: Ali Akbar Miah, Asom Gana Parishad.
 2006: Hafiz Bashir Ahmed, Assam United Democratic Front.
 2011: Hafiz Bashir Ahmed, All India United Democratic Front.
 2016: Hafiz Bashir Ahmed, All India United Democratic Front.
 2021: Hafiz Bashir Ahmed, All India United Democratic Front.

Election results

2016 result

2011 result

References

External links 
 

Assembly constituencies of Assam